Bloemaert is the name of a family of Dutch artists:
Abraham Bloemaert (1564 – 1651), Dutch painter and his sons:
Hendrick Bloemaert (1602 – 1672), Dutch painter
Cornelis Bloemaert (1603 – 1692), Dutch engraver
Adriaan Bloemaert (ca. 1609 – 1666), Dutch painter
Frederik Bloemaert (ca. 1614 – 1690), Dutch engraver

See also

Esther Barbara Bloemart